This is a list of past instructors in the Clarion Workshop, an annual writers' workshop for science fiction, fantasy, and speculative literature writers.

Instructors marked with an asterisk are also graduates of the Clarion or Clarion West workshops.

 Saladin Ahmed
 Eleanor Arnason
 Steven Barnes
 Christopher Barzak*
 Elizabeth Bear
 Michael Bishop
 Terry Bisson
 Holly Black
 Ben Bova
 Edward Bryant*
 Algis Budrys
 Octavia Butler*
 Orson Scott Card
 Suzy McKee Charnas
 Ted Chiang*
 Cassandra Clare
 Robert Crais*
 Ellen Datlow
 Samuel R. Delany
 Gordon Dickson
 Thomas Disch
 Cory Doctorow*
 Gardner Dozois
 Tananarive Due
 Andy Duncan*
 David Anthony Durham
 Scott Edelman
 Phyllis Eisenstein
 Harlan Ellison
 Carol Emshwiller
 Charles Coleman Finlay
 Jeffrey Ford
 Karen Joy Fowler
 James Frenkel
 Gregory Frost*
 Neil Gaiman
 Lisa Goldstein
 Martin Greenberg
 Joe Haldeman
 Elizabeth Hand
 Harry Harrison
 Patrick Nielsen Hayden
 Nina Kiriki Hoffman
 Nalo Hopkinson*
 N.K. Jemisin
 K.W. Jeter
 Kij Johnson*
 Mat Johnson
 Gwyneth Jones
 James Patrick Kelly*
 John Kessel
 Damon Knight
 Nancy Kress
 Michael Kube-McDowell
 Ellen Kushner
 Larissa Lai
 Margo Lanagan*
 Geoffrey A. Landis*
 Fritz Leiber
 Jonathan Lethem
 Kelly Link*
 Elizabeth Lynn
 George R.R. Martin
 Shawna McCarthy
 Judith Merril
 Maureen McHugh
 Kim Mohan
 Mary Anne Mohanraj*
 James Morrow
 Pat Murphy
 Paul Park
 Frederik Pohl
 Tim Powers
 Marta Randall
 Kit Reed
 Mike Resnick
 Kim Stanley Robinson*
 Spider and Jeanne Robinson
 Kristine Kathryn Rusch*
 Joanna Russ
 Richard Russo
 Geoff Ryman
 John Scalzi
 Lucius Shepard*
 Delia Sherman
 Dean Wesley Smith
 Norman Spinrad
 Sean Stewart
 Theodore Sturgeon
 Michael Swanwick
 Judith Tarr
 Robert Thurston*
 Mary A. Turzillo*
 Catherynne Valente
 Gordon Van Gelder*
 Ann VanderMeer
 Jeff VanderMeer*
 Joan Vinge
 Howard Waldrop
 Leslie What*
 Kate Wilhelm
 Sheila Williams
 Walter Jon Williams
 Connie Willis
 Robin Scott Wilson
 Gene Wolfe
 Patricia Wrede

2015 Instructors

Clarion 2015 writers in residence:

 Christopher Barzak
 Saladin Ahmed
 James Patrick Kelly
 Karen Joy Fowler
 Maureen McHugh
 Margo Lanagan

See also
 List of Clarion Writers Workshop Alumni
 List of Clarion West Writers Workshop Alumni
 Clarion Workshop
 Clarion West Writers Workshop
 Clarion South Writers Workshop

External links
Clarion Writing Program

Clarion West Writers Workshop instructors
Creative writing programs
Science fiction organizations
Clarion West Writers Workshop instructors
Clarion West Writers Workshop instructors